Pseudotropheus purpuratus is a species of cichlid endemic to Lake Malawi where it is known from Chisumulu Island.  This species can reach a length of  SL.

References

purpuratus
Fish described in 1976
Taxonomy articles created by Polbot